Bikić Do (Serbian Cyrillic: Бикић До, Rusyn: Бикич Дол) is a village in Serbia, in the Autonomous Province of Vojvodina. It is located in the municipality of Šid, in the Srem District. The village is ethnically mixed and its population numbering 336 people (2002 census).

Ethnic groups (2002 census)

 Rusyns = 160 (47.62%)
 Serbs = 110 (32.74%)
 Croats = 39 (11.61%)
 others.

Historical population

1981: 301
1991: 299
2002: 336

See also
List of places in Serbia
List of cities, towns and villages in Vojvodina
Pannonian Rusyns

References
Slobodan Ćurčić, Broj stanovnika Vojvodine, Novi Sad, 1996.

Populated places in Syrmia
Pannonian Rusyns